Sarandë Airfield  is a public use airfield located 3.7 kilometres east of Sarandë, Vlorë, Albania.

As of 2023, most public domain sources consider the field as abandoned, based upon satellite imagery.

See also
 List of airports in Albania

References

External links 
 Airport record for Sarandë Airport at Landings.com.
 

Airports in Albania
Buildings and structures in Sarandë